Maria Amália Vaz de Carvalho (1 February 1847 – 24 March 1921) was a Portuguese writer and poet. She was the first woman to join the Portuguese Academy of Sciences (Academia das Ciências de Lisboa).

Life
The daughter of José Vaz de Carvalho and Maria Cristina de Almeida e Albuquerque, she was married to the poet António Cândido Gonçalves Crespo.

She wrote for several newspapers in Portugal (Diário Popular, Repórter, Artes e Letras) and Brazil (Jornal do Comércio, Rio de Janeiro), under the pseudonym Maria de Sucena.

As well as poetry, she wrote short stories, essays, biographies, and literary criticism. The collection of stories for children she wrote with her husband, Contos para os nossos filhos (Tales for our Children, 1886) was approved by the Board of Public Instruction for use in schools. She was one of the first women in Portugal who were concerned with women's subordinate status and in particular about improving the educational opportunities for Women in Portugal together with Francisca Wood, Alice Pestana, Carolina Michaëlis de Vasconcelos, Alice Moderno, Angelina Vidal, Antónia Pusich and Guiomar Torrezão.

Her house was the first literary salon in Lisbon; they were hosts to Eça de Queiroz, Camilo Castelo Branco, Ramalho Ortigão and Guerra Junqueiro.

In 1993, the municipality of Loures (where she had lived as a child) established a literary award in her name called the Maria Amália Vaz de Carvalho Prize - Children's Literature (awarded 1937-1961). The 1938 winner was writer Maria Archer. 

She died in Lisbon, aged 74, and was buried there in the Prazeres Cemetery.

Works

Biographies
Vida do Duque de Palmela D.Pedro de Sousa e Holstein, 1898–1903

Short story collections
Contos para os nossos filhos, 1886
Contos e Fantasias, 1880

Literary criticism
Alguns Homens do Meu Tempo, 1889
Pelo Mundo Fora, 1889
A Arte de Viver na Sociedade, 1897
Em Portugal e no Estrangeiro, 1899
Figuras de Hoje e de Ontem, 1902
Cérebros e Corações, 1903
Ao Correr do Tempo, 1906
Impressões da História, 1911
Coisas do Século XVIII em Portugal, Coisas de Agora, 1913

Education
Mulheres e creanças: nota sobre educação, 1880

Essays
Serões no Campo, 1877

Poetry
Uma Primavera de Mulher, 1867
Vozes no Ermo, 1867

References

External links
 
 

1847 births
1921 deaths
Portuguese journalists
People from Lisbon
19th-century Portuguese women writers
19th-century Portuguese poets
19th-century journalists
Portuguese women journalists
20th-century Portuguese writers
20th-century Portuguese women writers
Portuguese women short story writers
Portuguese short story writers
19th-century short story writers
20th-century short story writers
19th-century women journalists